Sir Mark Alexander Lennox-Boyd (born 4 May 1943) is a British Conservative politician.

Political career
Lennox-Boyd contested Brent South in October 1974, being defeated by Labour's Laurie Pavitt.

He was MP for Morecambe and Lonsdale from 1979 to 1983, and the (slightly renamed) Morecambe and Lunesdale from 1983 until his defeat by Labour's Geraldine Smith in 1997. He served as Parliamentary Private Secretary to the Secretary of State for Energy from 1981 to 1983, PPS to the Chancellor of the Exchequer from 1983 to 1984, Assistant government whip from 1984 to 1986; a Lord Commissioner of HM Treasury (Government whip) from 1986 to 1988, Parliamentary Private Secretary to the Prime Minister, Margaret Thatcher from 1988 to 1990, and as a Parliamentary Under-Secretary of state in the Foreign and Commonwealth Office from 1990 to 1994.

After Parliament
Lennox-Boyd is a member of the Court of the Fishmongers' company, Prime Warden 1998–99, and served as chairman of the Company's Education and Grants committee 2010–15.  He is a trustee of the Georgian Group, and was chairman between 2014 and 2015. He is a Patron of Prisoners Abroad, a charity that supports the welfare of Britons imprisoned overseas and their families, and Patron of the British Sundial Society.

Family
He is a son of Alan Lennox-Boyd, 1st Viscount Boyd of Merton. He is married to Arabella Lennox-Boyd née Parisi (born 1938). Lady Lennox-Boyd was born in Italy, but left to settle in England where she later undertook a course in Landscape Architecture at Thames Polytechnic, which went on to become part of the University of Greenwich.

References

 "Times Guide to the House of Commons", Times Newspapers Limited, 1997 edition.

1943 births
Living people
Conservative Party (UK) MPs for English constituencies
Younger sons of viscounts
UK MPs 1979–1983
UK MPs 1983–1987
UK MPs 1987–1992
UK MPs 1992–1997
Parliamentary Private Secretaries to the Prime Minister